Animula vagula blandula is the first line of a poem which appears in the Historia Augusta as the work of the dying emperor Hadrian.

It has been extensively studied and there are numerous translations.  The author of the Historia Augusta was disparaging but later authors such as Isaac Casaubon were more respectful.

Poor little, wandering, charming soul
Guest and companion of my body,
What place will you go to now?
Pale, stiff, naked little thing,
Nor will you be making jokes as you always do.

It was translated by D. Johnston as follows:

Oh, loving Soul, my own so tenderly,
My life’s companion and my body’s guest,
To what new realms, poor flutterer, wilt thou fly?
Cheerless, disrobed, and cold in thy lone quest,
Hushed thy sweet fancies, mute thy wonted jest.

Some translators take the adjectives in line 4 as neuter plural, agreeing with the word  (places), but the majority take them as feminine singular, describing the soul.

Each line is an iambic dimeter (u – u – | u – u –), but the first two long elements in line 1 have been resolved into two short syllables, making tribrachs.

References

External links
 A website providing context and potential translations to Animula vagula blandula
 Forty-three translations of Hadrian's Animula Blandula

Hadrian
Last words
Latin poems